A Tangled Web is a 1956 British crime novel by Cecil Day-Lewis, written under the pen name of Nicholas Blake. It was one of four stand-alone novels he wrote under the name alongside the Nigel Strangeways detective novels. It was published by Harper in the United States under the alternative title Death and Daisy Bland.

Synopsis
Daisy Bland, a country girl working in a London dress shop, encounters the charming Hugo Chesterman and they begin a relationship. She discovers that he is a cat burglar. However when he is accused of a murder he didn't commit, her evidence unwittingly threatens to send him to the gallows.

References

Bibliography
 Bargainnier, Earl F. Twelve Englishmen of Mystery. Popular Press, 1984.
 Reilly, John M. Twentieth Century Crime & Mystery Writers. Springer, 2015.
 Stanford, Peter. C Day-Lewis: A Life. A&C Black, 2007.

1956 British novels
Novels by Cecil Day-Lewis
British crime novels
British thriller novels
Collins Crime Club books
Novels set in London